The Journal of Raman Spectroscopy is a monthly peer-reviewed scientific journal covering all aspects of Raman spectroscopy, including Higher Order Processes, and Brillouin and Rayleigh scattering. It was established in 1973 and is published by John Wiley & Sons. The editor-in-chief is Laurence A. Nafie (Syracuse University).

Abstracting and indexing
The journal is abstracted and indexed in:

According to the Journal Citation Reports, the journal has a 2020 impact factor of 3.133.

Notable papers
, the most cited papers published by the journal are:

References

External links

Chemistry journals
Wiley (publisher) academic journals
English-language journals
Publications established in 1973
Monthly journals
Raman spectroscopy